KV65 is an unexcavated, possible tomb located in the Valley of the Kings, near Luxor, Egypt. As of August 2008, when its discovery was announced, nothing of its layout, decoration or owner is known. The tomb entrance appears to be of an 18th Dynasty style.

See also
 KV63
 KV64

Notes

2008 archaeological discoveries
Valley of the Kings